Den' (The Day) is a Kyiv-based daily broadsheet newspaper. The newspaper is published in three languages: Ukrainian, Russian and English.

History and profile
Den was founded in 1996.

Larysa Ivshyna is the paper's editor-in-chief.  The paper was linked to former prime minister Yevhen Marchuk, her husband.

The paper is also notable for its annual photography contest, being the main photo event in Ukraine.

Den is a member of UAPP.

References

External links
 Official website (including archives of the newspaper (1996present))

1996 establishments in Ukraine
Publications established in 1996
Daily newspapers published in Ukraine
English-language newspapers published in Europe
Russian-language newspapers published in Ukraine
Ukrainian-language newspapers
Mass media in Kyiv
Ukrainian news websites